Dimitris Kontominas (3 June 1939 – 10 March 2022) was a Greek businessman who was active in insurance, television, cinema, and retail trade.

Life and career

Kontominas was born on 3 June 1939 in Athens, Greece. He studied at the American University of Beirut. Initially he worked as an insurer in American Life (ALICO). In 1969, he cofounded with Alexander Tampoura the insurance company Interamerican. Interamerican now belongs to Eureko BV. Kontominas remained chairman until 2005.

Kontominas owned Prime Insurance and MyDirect insurers. He founded or acquired other companies, including:
 Interbank (later acquired and absorbed by Eurobank in 1997)
 Intertech (exclusive representative products Panasonic)
 Euroclinic Athens
 Novabank Greece SA (Because NovaBank's then parent company was Millennium BCP (Banco Comercial Português), on 6 November 2006, NovaBank was renamed Millennium Bank which was acquired by Piraeus Bank in 2013)
 InterJet – aircraft and helicopter fleet
 GreenFarm
 Aris F.C.
 Alpha TV and radio station Alpha 98.9 (66% held by January 2012, the German RTL Group)
 Village Roadshow Greece theaters
 Athens/Thessaloniki Channel 9 and radio station Alpha 96.5 Radio in Thessaloniki

In 2012, Kontominas took back the shares of Alpha TV when RTL Group decided to exit. 

In 2015, Alpha TV was the number one Greek TV station.

Kontominas was the president of DEMCO GROUP, one of Greece's largest investment holding companies. It has a diversified portfolio, with holdings in media, financial services, entertainment, IT & telecoms, leisure & entertainment, and food & beverages. Within its companies' portfolio one can find Village Group (cinema and films), Alpha TV and Alpha Radio, Intertech (Panasonic's exclusive representative in Greece), Prime Insurance, myDirect online insurance, Sportday newspaper and many more. 

For a little time in the early 2000s he was the owner of Aris F.C.

He was declared "Great Protekdikos Archon of the Ecumenical Throne" by the Ecumenical Patriarchate of Constantinople and "Great Benefactor" by the Metropolis of Chalcedon.

He was arrested in 2014. According to the authorities approximately 200 million euros worth of loans were issued by the bank, during the period in question to companies controlled by certain well-connected businessmen without guarantees, none of which have been repaid. The case is also linked to another financial scandal involving another 300 million euros worth of losses due to bad loans made to a property developer. The accused faced charges including fraud, money laundering and complicity in malpractice. The story made headlines in 2014 by a rival channel Alter owned by Nikos Kouris.

Kontominas died on 10 March 2022, at the age of 82. He had one daughter and two grandchildren.

References

Sources
Biography of Dimitris Kontominas at asfalistis.gr
Dimitris Kontominas profile on bloomberg.com
Demco Group of Companies of Dimitris Kontominas

1939 births
2022 deaths
American University of Beirut alumni
Aris Thessaloniki F.C.
Businesspeople from Athens
Greek football chairmen and investors
Greek art collectors